The CEV qualification for the 2010 FIVB Women's Volleyball World Championship saw member nations compete for eight places at the finals in Japan.

Draw
33 of the 55 CEV national teams entered qualification. (Iceland later withdrew) The teams were distributed according to their position in the FIVB Senior Women's Rankings as of 5 January 2008 using the serpentine system for their distribution. (Rankings shown in brackets) Teams ranked 1–6 did not compete in the first and second rounds, and automatically qualified for the third round. Teams ranked 7–20 did not compete in the first round, and automatically qualified for the second round.

First round

 Iceland withdrew and Montenegro replaced Iceland in Pool B to balance the number of teams in each group.

Second round

Third round

First round

Pool A
Venue:  Sport Hall Lendava, Lendava, Slovenia
Dates: January 9–11, 2009
All times are Central European Time (UTC+01:00)

|}

|}

Pool B
Venue:  English Institute of Sport, Sheffield, United Kingdom
Dates: January 2–4, 2009
All times are Greenwich Mean Time (UTC±00:00)

|}

|}

Pool C
Venue:  Kalevi Spordihall, Tallinn, Estonia
Dates: January 9–11, 2009
All times are Eastern European Time (UTC+02:00)

|}

|}

Second round

Pool D
Venue:  Olympic and Leisure Complex, Quba, Azerbaijan
Dates: May 15–17, 2009
All times are Azerbaijan Summer Time (UTC+05:00)

|}

|}

Pool E
Venue:  Arena Gripe, Split, Croatia
Dates: May 15–17, 2009
All times are Central European Summer Time (UTC+02:00)

|}

|}

Pool F
Venue:  Sport Hall Orlovec, Gabrovo, Bulgaria
Dates: May 13–17, 2009
All times are Eastern European Summer Time (UTC+03:00)

|}

|}

Pool G
Venue:  Palais des Sports, Marseille, France
Dates: May 13–17, 2009
All times are Central European Summer Time (UTC+02:00)

|}

|}

Third round

Pool H
Venue:  Zoppas Arena, Conegliano, Italy
Dates: July 17–19, 2009
All times are Central European Summer Time (UTC+02:00)

|}

|}

Pool I
Venue:  Hala Sportova Dudova Suma, Subotica, Serbia
Dates: July 17–19, 2009
All times are Central European Summer Time (UTC+02:00)

|}

|}

Pool J
Venue:  Hala Podpromie, Rzeszów, Poland
Dates: July 17–19, 2009
All times are Central European Summer Time (UTC+02:00)

|}

|}

Pool K
Venue:  Topsportcentrum, Almere, Netherlands
Dates: July 17–19, 2009
All times are Central European Summer Time (UTC+02:00)

|}

|}

References

External links
 2010 World Championship Qualification

2010 FIVB Volleyball Women's World Championship
2009 in volleyball
FIVB Volleyball World Championship qualification